Paul Currie (born 30 January 1985) is a former Scottish footballer.

Career
Currie began his youth football career with Musselburgh Windsor from their colts team through to Under 13's, winning Player of the Year, from there he joined Leith Athletic at under-15 level before joining the youth system at Cowdenbeath. After a spell at his hometown club Musselburgh Athletic, Currie had a season with Scottish Second Division side Raith Rovers before returning to Musselburgh.

Berwick Rangers
Currie joined Berwick Rangers in 2009, making his debut on 19 September against Elgin City scoring Berwick's second goal in their 3–3 draw. In all he made 75 appearances in all competitions scoring 23 goals for the club.

Hamilton
On 31 August 2011 Currie signed for Hamilton Academical after the second of two offers was accepted by Berwick. He made his debut on 10 September against Queen of the South at Palmerston Park. His first goal for the club came on 15 October against Morton in their 2–0 win, going on to score from the spot against Ayr United on 29 October. He was released by Hamilton upon his request in January 2012, and as FIFA regulations allow a player to play for only two Senior clubs in a season, Currie returned to Musselburgh Athletic for a third spell until the summer.

Arbroath
Currie signed for Arbroath in June 2012 after joining the club for pre-season training. Despite being a first team regular at Gayfield, he left for Junior side Bonnyrigg Rose Athletic in February 2013, signing an 18-month contract.

Career statistics

References

External links

1985 births
Living people
Scottish footballers
Raith Rovers F.C. players
Musselburgh Athletic F.C. players
Berwick Rangers F.C. players
Hamilton Academical F.C. players
Arbroath F.C. players
Bonnyrigg Rose Athletic F.C. players
Sportspeople from Musselburgh
Footballers from Edinburgh
Association football midfielders
Scottish Junior Football Association players
Scottish Football League players
Leith Athletic F.C. players
Cowdenbeath F.C. players
Footballers from East Lothian
Kelty Hearts F.C. players
Scottish Professional Football League players